Nuth is a village and was a municipality in the province of Limburg, situated in the southern Netherlands. In January 2019, the municipality merged with Schinnen and Onderbanken to form Beekdaelen.

The village of Nuth has 4,595 inhabitants (1 January 2021), and is with that the largest village of the municipality. The town hall of the municipality Nuth was also situated in the village Nuth. The other villages in the municipality were Hulsberg with 3972 inhabitants, Schimmert with 3184, Wijnandsrade with 1623 and Vaesrade with 997 inhabitants (data: 1-1-2021). The other population centres belong to one of the following villages.

Population centres 
Aalbeek, Arensgenhout, Grijzegrubben, Helle, Hellebroek, Hulsberg, Laar, Schimmert, Swier, Terstraten, Vaesrade, Wijnandsrade.

Topography

Dutch Topographic map of the municipality of Nuth, June 2015

Transportation

 Railway station: Nuth
 Exit 5 of the A76 Motorway

Some facts about Nuth
The patron Saint of Nuth is St. Bavo, after which the parish is named.
The municipality expanded all the way from Hoensbroek to Meerssen.
From 2004 Nuth boasted a one Michelin star restaurant, In de'n Dillegaard, and Nuth made the international press when the restaurant owner returned the coveted star in 2009 over concerns of being too elitist.

Notable people
 Hubert Bruls, politician, Mayor of Nijmegen (born 1966)
 Hans Coumans, painter (1943–1986)
 Jan Drummen, architect (1891–1966)
 Karel van der Hucht, astronomer (born 1946)
 Auguste Kerckhoffs, linguist and cryptographer (1835–1903)
 Joseph Kerckhoffs, physician (1789–1867)
 Joep Packbiers, archer, Olympic champion (1875–1957)
 Jos Schreurs, Roman Catholic priest and Dutch senator (1934–2022)
 Frans de Wever, general practitioner (1869–1940)

References

External links

Beekdaelen
South Limburg (Netherlands)
Former municipalities of Limburg (Netherlands)
Populated places in Limburg (Netherlands)
Municipalities of the Netherlands disestablished in 2019